The Minister of Highways, Ports & Shipping was an appointment in the Cabinet of Sri Lanka that was responsible for the creation, development, implementation and the governance of the highways, ports and their transport services and the headquarters of the institutions under the ministry. The post was first created in 1960 March as Minister of Nationalized Services, Shipping & Transport, in 1960 July it was renamed as the Minister of Commerce, Trade, Food & Shipping. The section Highways was included in the post of the Minister of Irrigation, Power & Highways in both, 1970 and 1977 years. In the 1977, the section Shipping was included in the Minister of Shipping, Aviation & Tourism. In 1989 The responsibilities of the sections Ports and Shipping were under the Minister of Ports & Shipping and the Minister of Trade & Shipping and the responsibilities of section Highways were under the Minister of Transport & Highways. In 2000 the section of Ports was under the Minister of Ports Development & Development of the South ,the section Highways was under the Minister of Highways ,the section of Shipping was under the Minister of Internal & International Trade Commerce, Muslim Religious Affairs & Shipping Development. The responsibilities of the sections of Highways and into some distance Shipping too were under the Minister of Transport, Highways & Aviation in 2001. The section Highways was under the Minister of Highways & Road Development and the sections Ports and Shipping were under the Minister of Ports & Aviation in 2005.
The original name Minister of Highways, Ports and Shipping was given for the post in 2010. The position was abolished and divided into the portfolios of the Minister of Ports and Shipping and Ministry of Higher Education and Highways with the portfolio reshuffle in January 2015 under the Sirisena cabinet.

List of Highways, Ports & Shipping Ministers
Parties

See also
 Ministry of Highways, Ports & Shipping

References

External links
 Ministry of Highways, Ports & Shipping
 Government of Sri Lanka

 
Highways, Ports and Shipping